Brau Holding International GmbH & Co. KGaA is a holding company for several breweries in Germany.

It was founded in 2002 and is owned by Schörghuber Unternehmensgruppe.

Subsidiaries
 Paulaner Group
 Paulaner, Munich
 Hacker-Pschorr Brewery, Munich
 Thurn und Taxis Brewery, Regensburg
 AuerBräu, Rosenheim
 Hopf Brewery, Miesbach
 Kulmbacher Group
 Kulmbacher Brewery, Kulmbach
 Sternquell Brewery, Plauen
 Würzburger Hofbräu, Würzburg
 Scherdel Brewery, Hof
 Braustolz, Chemnitz
 Südwest Brewery Group
 Fürstenberg Brewery, Donaueschingen
 Hoepfner Brewery, Karlsruhe
 Schmucker Brewery, Ober-Mossau

References

company homepage

Breweries in Germany